The prime minister of Syria (Arabic: رئيس وزراء سوريا), formally titled the president of the Council of Ministers, is the head of government of the Syrian Arab Republic.

Nomination
The prime minister is appointed by the president of Syria, along with other ministers and members of the government that the new prime minister recommends.

The People's Assembly of Syria then approve the legislative program of the new government, before the new government formally take office.  

There are no constitutional limits on a prime minister's term, and several of them served multiple non-consecutive terms.

Powers and removal
Powers:  
Enforcing laws
Supervising government bodies
Passing administrative decisions
Advising the president
Overseeing the Cabinet

Removal:  
Upon dismissal by the president
Upon submission of resignation to the president
Upon removal or resignation of the president
Upon a vote of no-confidence by the legislature

See also
Politics of Syria
Deputy Prime Minister of Syria

References

Politics of Syria
Government of Syria
1946 establishments in Syria